The 2012 Superstars Series Monza round was the first round of the 2012 Superstars Series season. It took place on 1 April at the Autodromo Nazionale Monza.

Massimo Pigoli won the first race, starting from pole position, driving a Jaguar XFR, and Vitantonio Liuzzi gained the second one, driving a Mercedes C63 AMG.

Classification

Qualifying

Race 1

Notes:
 – Massimo Pigoli's fastest lap was deleted due to a track cutting.
 – Paolo Meloni was given a 3-second penalty for causing a collision with Massimiliano Mugelli.

Race 2

Standings after the event

International Series and Italian Championship standings

Teams' Championship standings

 Note: Only the top five positions are included for both sets of drivers' standings.

References

2012 in Italian motorsport
Superstars Series seasons